Polyptychoceras is an extinct genus of ammonites from the Late Cretaceous of Asia, Europe, and North and South America. It was first named by Hisakatsu Yabe in 1927.

Species and subspecies
This genus contains the following eight species and one subgenus, Subtychoceras, which contains one species.

 Polyptychoceras mihoense
 Polyptychoceras pseudogaultinum, could reach a length of 100 – 120 mm
 Polyptychoceras haradanum (Yokoyama) 
 Polyptychoceras obatai 
 Polyptychoceras obliquecostatum
 Polyptychoceras subunduratum
 Polyptychoceras obstrictum (Jimbo) 
 Polyptychoceras vancouverensis, located around the Trent and Puntledge Rivers. Due to its shape, fossil poachers often call it the "paperclip ammonite" or "candy cane".
 Polyptychoceras (Subptychoceras) yubarense, could reach a maximum length of 200 mm

Description

Polyptychoceras is a heteromorph ammonite, meaning that its shell does not curl up into the tight spiral shape which shells of ammonites from the subclass Ammonoidea typically do.

Polyptychoceras shells have an abrupt weight increase after formation of the initial shaft, which represents the shell's automatic balance condition. This would have caused the shell to topple over if on land. The soft body of the animal would have to have been large, in order to keep the falling shaft off of the ground. The body would not have been resistant to the pressing shell.

Although the shafts in the fossils of the shells are usually parallel to each other, small aberrations during each growth stage often caused abrupt constrictions in the shape of the shell.

Life
A Japanese study in 1979 suggested that Polyptychoceras lived and travelled in schools, similarly to modern cuttlefish. Individual fossil specimens of a particular species of Polyptychoceras are frequently found in sediments laid down in the same bed of water, around the Santonian and Upper Coniacian faunal stages of the Late Cretaceous Epoch. Polyptychoceras was probably buoyant, and swam in a slow, somewhat up-and-down locomotion. It also likely preferred living in sheltered parts of deep sea levels, although how deep is uncertain. Subptychoceras yubarense was likely very long like an eel, and preferred a benthic mode of life.

Distribution
Fossils of Polyptychoceras have been found in Angola, Antarctica, Argentina, Austria, Japan, Mexico, the Russian Federation, and the United States (California).

References

Further reading
 West Coast Fossils: A Guide to the Ancient Life of Vancouver Island by Rolf Ludvigsen and Graham Beard
 Special papers / Nihon Koseibutsu Gakkai; page 29. Published 1984; Original from the University of California
 Geological Abstracts; page 1324. By Geo Abstracts Bibliography; Published 1986, Elsevier/Geo Abstracts
 Memoirs; page 157. By Fukuoka, Japan Kyushu University. Faculty of Science, Hokkaido University Faculty of Engineering; Published 1959
 Memoirs of the Faculty of Science, Kyushu University; pages 117 - 119. By Kyūshū Daigaku Rigakubu; Published 1940
 Ammonite Faunas of the Upper Cretaceous Rocks of Vancouver Island, British Columbia; pages 100 - 101. By J L Usher, Geological Survey of Canada; Published 1952 E. Cloutier, Queen's Printer

External links
 Polyptychoceras in the Ammonite Database
 Polyptychoceras at Zipcodezoo.com

Ammonitida genera
Turrilitoidea
Cretaceous ammonites
Ammonites of Asia
Late Cretaceous animals of Asia
Late Cretaceous ammonites of Europe
Late Cretaceous ammonites of North America
Cretaceous Mexico
Cretaceous United States
Ammonites of South America
Late Cretaceous animals of South America
Cretaceous Argentina